Colette Kelleher (born 16 January 1962) is an Irish former Independent politician who served as a Senator from 2016 to 2020, after being nominated by the Taoiseach. She previously served as the CEO of the Alzheimer's Society of Ireland.

She comes from Macroom, County Cork, and she formerly worked as a social worker in Dublin. She holds an MBA and she led the Cork Simon Community for eight years before moving to the COPE Foundation.

She was a member of the Civil Engagement group in the 25th Seanad.

References

1962 births
Living people
Members of the 25th Seanad
21st-century women members of Seanad Éireann
Independent members of Seanad Éireann
Nominated members of Seanad Éireann
People from Macroom
Alumni of University College Cork
Alumni of the University of Southampton